Akram Roumani (born 1 April 1978) is a Moroccan former footballer who played as a defender. He has played for the Morocco national football team on 13 occasions.

He started his career with Maghreb Fez (MAS Fes) in the Moroccan league, and was transferred to KRC Genk in 2000, for whom he made over 100 appearances.

He helped Genk win the Belgian title in 2002, only their second ever title.

Roumani was loaned to RBC Roosendaal for the 2005/06 season.

Roumani played for Morocco at the 2000 Olympics, and was in the squad for the 2002 African Nations Cup.

References

External links 

1978 births
Living people
Moroccan footballers
Moroccan expatriate footballers
Morocco international footballers
Olympic footballers of Morocco
Footballers at the 2000 Summer Olympics
2002 African Cup of Nations players
2004 African Cup of Nations players
Belgian Pro League players
Eredivisie players
K.R.C. Genk players
RBC Roosendaal players
Fath Union Sport players
Expatriate footballers in Belgium
Expatriate footballers in the Netherlands
People from Fez, Morocco
Association football defenders